SLIME, the Superior Lisp Interaction Mode for Emacs, is an Emacs mode for developing Common Lisp applications. SLIME originates in an Emacs mode called SLIM written by Eric Marsden. It is developed as an open-source public domain software project by Luke Gorrie and Helmut Eller. Over 100 Lisp developers have contributed code to SLIME since the project was started in 2003. SLIME uses a backend called Swank that is loaded into Common Lisp.

SLIME works with the following Common Lisp implementations:

 CMU Common Lisp (CMUCL)
 Scieneer Common Lisp
 Steel Bank Common Lisp (SBCL)
 Clozure CL (former OpenMCL)
 LispWorks
 Allegro Common Lisp
 CLISP
 Embeddable Common Lisp (ECL)
 Armed Bear Common Lisp (ABCL)

Some implementations of other programming languages are using SLIME:

 Clojure
 JavaScript
 Kawa, a Scheme implementation
 GNU R
 Ruby
 MIT Scheme
 Scheme48

There are also clones of SLIME:

 SOLID for OCaml

References

External links 
 SLIME project page
 The birth of SLIME on the cmucl-imp mailing list (August 2003)
 SLIME presentation by Tobias Rittweiler (2008)
 Review of SLIME by Andy Wingo
 Bill Clementson's "Slime Tips and Techniques" - Part 1 (See also Part 2, Part 3, Part 4, Part 5, Part 6, and Part 7)
 Bill Clementson's "SLIME Refactoring" describes how to set up SLIME
 Bill Clementson's "Emacs Keymaps and the SLIME scratch buffer
 Bill Clementson's "CL, Music and SLIME Tutorials" contains a good SLIME tutorial
 Marco Baringer's (SLIME guru) SLIME setup
 Marco Baringer's "Editing Lisp Code with Emacs"
 The slime-devel Archives
 Up-to-date Swank for MIT/GNU Scheme for use with SLIME CVS

Common Lisp (programming language) software
Emacs
Free software programmed in Lisp
Free integrated development environments
Scheme (programming language)
Public-domain software with source code